The 2013–14 American Eagles men's basketball team represented American University during the 2013–14 NCAA Division I men's basketball season. The Eagles, led by first year head coach Mike Brennan, played their home games at Bender Arena and were members of the Patriot League. They finished the season 20–13, 13–5 in Patriot League play to finish in second place. They were champions of the Patriot League tournament to earn an automatic bid to the NCAA tournament where they lost in the second round to Wisconsin.

Roster

Schedule

|-
!colspan=9 style="background:#0000FF; color:#CC0000;"| Regular season

|-
!colspan=9 style="background:#0000FF; color:#CC0000;"| Patriot League tournament

|-
!colspan=9 style="background:#0000FF; color:#CC0000;"| NCAA tournament

References

American Eagles men's basketball seasons
American
American Eagles men's basketball
American Eagles men's basketball
American